Functional Ecology is a monthly peer-reviewed scientific journal covering physiological, behavioural, and evolutionary ecology, as well as ecosystems and community ecology, emphasizing an integrative approach. 

The journal was established in 1987 and is published by Wiley-Blackwell on behalf of the British Ecological Society. The editors-in-chief are Lara Ferry (Arizona State University), Charles Fox (University of Kentucky), Katie Field (University of Sheffield), Emma Sayer (University of Lancaster), and Enrico Rezende (Pontifical Catholic University of Chile).

Abstracting and indexing
The journal is abstracted and indexed in Aquatic Sciences and Fisheries Abstracts, BIOSIS Previews, Current Contents/Agriculture, Biology & Environmental Sciences, the Science Citation Index, Scopus. According to the Journal Citation Reports, the journal has a 2021 impact factor of 6.28.

Types of papers
The journal publishes the following types of papers:
 Standard Research Papers - a typical experimental, comparative or theoretical paper
 Reviews - syntheses of topics of broad ecological interest
 Perspectives - short articles presenting new ideas (without data) intended to stimulate scientific debate
 Special Features - a collection of manuscripts, typically Reviews or Perspectives, on a single theme

The journal also produces podcasts on a semi-regular basis, usually focusing on a recent article and has a blog, which includes interviews with authors and articles relating to the ecological academic and research community.

References

External links

Wiley-Blackwell academic journals
Ecology journals
Publications established in 1987
British Ecological Society academic journals
Monthly journals
English-language journals